Rushon (Rushan, Pamiri: Ręxon) is a village and the seat of Rushon District of Gorno-Badakhshan Autonomous Region in southeastern Tajikistan. The jamoat has a total population of 6,577 (2015).

Geography
It was known as Kala-i Vamar until 1932. It is on the river Panj just downstream from the mouth of the Bartang at the point where the Panj briefly turns west before resuming its northerly course. There is a small museum and the ruins of a Kala-i Vamar (Vamardiž) a mediaeval era fort.

History

It is believed that the fort Vamardiž was built by local people in defence of the Chinese advancement to Pamirs. Many times Vamardiž fell to Shahs of Darwaz and Shughnan remaining under control of Shughnan until Afghans of Badakhshan took it on the last quarter of 19th century. In 1885 Russians liberated Pamiri kingdoms of Panj right bank but soon turned them into Beyli's (Бекство) of Turkish Manghit Bukhara where one of them resided in Vamardiž till the October Revolution. During Soviet Era Vamardiž was destroyed and the territory of fort demolished giving way to military base facilities. 

On the morning of May 18, 2022, Rushon was the scene of a violent crackdown on protesters by security forces with several casualties. Local residents had been blocking the road to Khorugh, where protests against human rights violations were ongoing, in order to prevent a military convoy from passing.

Notes

References

Populated places in Gorno-Badakhshan